The Mbuji-Mayi River, also spelt Bushmaie, Bushimaie, Bushimay or Mbushimaie, is a river in the Democratic Republic of the Congo, a major tributary of the Sankuru River. It flows northwards from the Kapanga Territory in the province of Lualaba to the province of Kasaï-Oriental, where it is the namesake of the city of Mbuji-Mayi.

From the 17th to 19th centuries, the river formed one of the borders of the Kingdom of Lunda.

References 

Rivers of the Democratic Republic of the Congo